Lijevi Štefanki is a village in Zagreb County, in Croatia.

Geography 
It's located 42.5 km from the national capital, Zagreb.

Populated places in Zagreb County